USS Riverside (APA-102) was a  in service with the United States Navy from 1944 to 1946. In 1948, she was sold into commercial service. She sank in Smyth Channel, Chile, in 1968.

History 
The second U.S. Navy ship to be named Riverside, she was laid down on 11 November 1942 by the Ingalls Shipbuilding Co., Pascagoula, Mississippi, under Maritime Commission contract (M.C. hull 870); launched 13 April 1944; sponsored by Mrs. Sidney Swan; acquired by the Navy on loan charter; designated APA-102; and commissioned on 29 June 1944. Then ordered to New York City for conversion to an attack transport at the Atlantic Basin Iron Works yard, she was decommissioned on 8 July, converted, and recommissioned on 18 December 1944.

Pacific War
After shakedown in Chesapeake Bay, Riverside proceeded to Davisville, Rhode Island; loaded men and equipment of the 81st Construction Battalion; and departed for the Pacific Ocean. Transiting the Panama Canal on 30 January 1945, she continued on to Pearl Harbor, arriving on 15 February. She then carried patients and passengers to California. In mid-April, she returned to Hawaii; conducted amphibious landing exercises through May; tested equipment and trained personnel in cargo handling in June; and in mid-June got underway on another Hawaii-California run. At the end of the month, she shifted from San Pedro, California, to Portland, Oregon, for availability, and in early July steamed west with reinforcements for Okinawa.

Steaming via Guam and Ulithi, Riverside, flagship of Transport Squadron 21, arrived at the Hagushi anchorage on 12 August and discharged her cargo and passengers. Two days later the war ended. She then shifted around to Buckner Bay, whence she proceeded to the Philippines to embark U.S. Army occupation troops for Korea. From Korea she returned to Okinawa and toward the end of October joined the "Operation Magic Carpet" fleet to bring American troops back to the United States. At the end of January 1946, she completed her second trans-Pacific "Magic-Carpet" run. She then made a round trip to Hawaii and, in mid-February, she departed San Francisco, California, for the U.S. East Coast and inactivation.

Decommissioning and fate

Riverside arrived at Norfolk, Virginia, on 5 March 1946. Decommissioned on 27 April, she was redelivered to the Maritime Commission's War Shipping Administration on the 28th. Her name was struck from the Navy list on 8 May 1946, and she was sold to Pacific Argentina Brazil lines (P&T) in December 1948, renamed SS P&T Forester. She was sold to Moore McCormack Lines Inc. in March, 1957, renamed SS Mormacwave and sold for the final time to Grace Lines Inc. in August, 1966, renamed SS Santa Leonor. She was wrecked on 31 March 1968 on Isabel Island, in the Smyth Channel where her partially submerged wreck remains.

References

External links 

 NavSource Online: Amphibious Photo Archive - APA-102 Riverside

 

Bayfield-class attack transports
Ships built in Pascagoula, Mississippi
1944 ships
World War II amphibious warfare vessels of the United States
Riverside County, California
Shipwrecks in the Chilean Sea